Still Alive in '95 (Live in Japan) is a live album by Kramer, released in February 1996 by Creativeman Disc.

Track listing

Personnel 
Adapted from Still Alive in '95 (Live in Japan) liner notes.

Musicians
 Dogbowl – vocals, acoustic guitar
 Hugh Hopper – bass guitar
 Kramer – vocals, acoustic guitar, flute, mixing, mastering
 Damon Krukowski – drums
 Steve Watson – electric guitar

Production and additional personnel
 Alan Douches – mastering
 Hiroaki Doi – art direction, design
 Yoshiaki Kondo – recording, mixing
 Michael Macioce – photography

Release history

References

External links 
 Still Alive in '95 (Live in Japan) at Discogs (list of releases)

1995 live albums
Kramer (musician) albums
Albums produced by Kramer (musician)